Rigor Mortis was an American thrash/speed metal band that formed in 1983 in the Dallas–Fort Worth, Texas metroplex.

History 
Two schoolmates, Harden Harrison (drums) and Casey Orr (bass), formed the band when they met Mike Scaccia (guitar). The three young men shared an interest in horror/gore films and very heavy music. With Bruce Corbitt on vocals, they created some of the heaviest thrash metal at the time often flirting with death metal. They were also one of the only major thrash bands from Texas and virtually created the underground metal scene there. The band was signed by Capitol Records in 1987.

In 2005, the original lineup reunited and performed at Ozzfest 2008 in Texas. In 2009, Rigor Mortis played in Germany at the Keep It True Festival.

Mike Scaccia also played guitar with industrial metal band Ministry, Revolting Cocks, Lard, and others.

Casey Orr also plays bass in the shock rock band Gwar, as the character Beefcake the Mighty. He also played bass for Dallas punk rock band The Hellions.  He currently plays for Warbeast.

Harden Harrison also plays drums with the metal bands Speedealer and Mitra.

Bruce Corbitt also sang for the thrash metal band Warbeast (formerly Texas Metal Alliance). The band was signed by Phil Anselmo's label Housecore Records and their debut album Krush the Enemy was released on April 27, 2010. Warbeast's next release was a split album with Anselmo's solo material titled War of the Gargantuas and was released on January 8, 2013. Warbeast's second full-length album Destroy was released in 2013. Their final album, Enter the Arena, was released on August 4, 2017.

Former Rigor Mortis vocalist/guitarist Doyle Bright also played guitar in the metal band Hallows Eve. He currently performs vocals and guitars in the band SOG.

Rigor Mortis is featured on the shirt of the creature on the Toxic Holocaust album Evil Never Dies from 2003.

On December 23, 2012, the band's guitarist Mike Scaccia died from a heart attack while performing onstage.

On October 6, 2014, Rigor Mortis released their final album Slaves to the Grave, which had been recorded in February 2012 at Ministry's 13th Planet Studios in El Paso. With no label interested in the album, Rigor Mortis successfully crowdfunded the new album by raising $22,838 from fan pre-orders to self-release the final album.

After years of battling with cancer, Corbitt died on January 25, 2019, at the age of 56, making him the second member of Rigor Mortis (following Scaccia) to die.

The remaining members perform Rigor Mortis music under the moniker Wizards of Gore in tribute to Mike Scaccia.

Select discography
 1986: Demo 1986
 1988: The Decline of the Western Civilization Part 2 (The Metal Years) Soundtrack (Capitol)
 1988: Demons Demo
 1988: Rigor Mortis (Capitol) - Released on July 19, 1988
 1989: Freaks EP (Metal Blade)
 1991: Rigor Mortis Vs. The Earth (Triple X)
 1991: "Psycho Therapy" on Gabba Gabba Hey ‒ Ramones tribute album (Triple X)
 2014: Slaves to the Grave
 2018: Freaks Demo '89

Timeline

References

Sources
 History of Rigor Mortis w/ Bruce Corbitt
 Voices from the Darkside interview
 The Metal Den interview w/ Bruce Corbitt
 http://www.blabbermouth.net/news/rigor-mortis-slaves-to-the-grave-album-details-revealed/

1983 establishments in Texas
2013 disestablishments in Texas
American thrash metal musical groups
Heavy metal musical groups from Texas
Musical groups established in 1983
Musical groups reestablished in 2005
Musical groups disestablished in 2013
Crossover thrash groups
American speed metal musical groups
Musical quartets